Pan Pacific Singapore is a hotel located in Marina Centre, Singapore, and operated by the Pan Pacific Hotels and Resorts. With 38 floors, it is the tallest among the three hotels which are part of the Marina Square development, the other two being the Parkroyal Collection Marina Bay and Mandarin Oriental Singapore. The hotel has 790 rooms and suites, arranged around an atrium extending 35 floors of the building.

The hotel was renovated in 2005 and again in 2012 and it features a lounge in the atrium.

2012 transformation

The hotel completed its 4-month transformation and had a soft opening on 31 August 2012. The hotel has since been in full operation as of October 2012

Level 37 of this hotel was renamed as Level 38 and Hai Tien Lo restaurant gave up its place at the top of the hotel and moved down to Level 3. The Pacific Club which is the hotel's club lounge has since replaced the restaurant's former location.

Events
The hotel served as one of the main venues for the Singapore 2006, hosting the Program of Seminars in its meeting rooms.

The shooting of the Hindi film De Dana Dan took place in the hotel.

References

Further reading
 Aun Koh, Susan Leong (2006), Singapore chic, Archipelago Press,

External links

Pan Pacific Singapore Official Website

Skyscraper hotels in Singapore
Marina Centre
Downtown Core (Singapore)
Hotel buildings completed in 1987
Hotels established in 1987
John C. Portman Jr. buildings
20th-century architecture in Singapore